Igigi are the mythological figures of heaven in the mythology of Mesopotamia. Though sometimes synonymous with the term "Anunnaki", in one myth the Igigi were the younger beings who were servants of the Annunaki, until they rebelled and were replaced by the creation of humans.

Etymology
The name has unknown origin. It was originally spelt i-gi4-gi4, but was later also written as í-gì-gì. This latter may have been a play on words, as in Sumerian, the combination can be interpreted as numerals adding to 7 (the number of Great Gods), or multiplying to 600 (which in some traditions was the total number of gods).

Atrahasis 
Akkadian Paradise is described as a garden in the myth of Atrahasis where lower rank deities (the Igigi) are put to work digging a watercourse by the more senior deities (the Anunnaki).

The Igigi then rebel against the dictatorship of Enlil, setting fire to their tools and surrounding Enlil's great house by night. On hearing that toil on the irrigation channel is the reason for the disquiet, the Anunnaki council decide to create man to carry out agricultural labour.

See also
Anunnaki
Grigori

References

External links
Ancient Mesopotamian Gods and Goddesses: Igigi/Igigu (a group of gods)

Mesopotamian deities